Ante Ćorić (born 14 April 1997) is a Croatian professional footballer who plays as an attacking midfielder for Serie A club Roma. He has also represented the Croatia national team.

Club career

Early years
Ćorić started playing football at the age of 5 at Hrvatski Dragovoljac. When he was 9 years old, he signed for the youth academy of NK Zagreb. In 2009, Ćorić joined the youth academy of Red Bull Salzburg, despite the interest from other clubs, including Bayern Munich, Chelsea, and Barcelona. On joining the club, Ćorić commented, "I wanted to become a Red Bull Salzburg player because my team-mates here are better than players of the same age anywhere else. We train better and more often than others. And I was very impressed by how warmly I was welcomed." In 2013, after four years in Salzburg, Ćorić returned to Croatia and signed with Dinamo Zagreb for a fee of €900,000.

Dinamo Zagreb
On 16 April 2014, Ćorić made his senior debut against RNK Split, coming in as a 69th-minute substitute for Ivo Pinto. On 26 April, he made his first start in a 1–1 draw against Lokomotiva Zagreb. On 10 May, he scored his first senior goal for Dinamo in a 1–2 loss to NK Istra 1961. On 18 September, Ćorić came on as a 77th-minute substitute and scored the fifth goal in Dinamo's 2014–15 Europa League opener against Astra Giurgiu, a 5–1 win. With this goal, he became the youngest goalscorer in Europa League history, at the age of 17 years and 157 days. In 2015, the newspaper, Večernji list, awarded Ćorić the Croatian Hope of the Year award. In his nearly five seasons at the club, Ćorić made 143 appearances, winning four league titles, and two cup titles, and was named by the Italian newspaper, Gazzetta Dello Sport, as one of the "30 Best U20 Players in Europe" in 2017.

Roma
On 28 May 2018, Ćorić joined Italian club Roma for a reported fee of €6 million and signed a five-year contract on €1 million salary per year, after passing his medical.

Almería (loan)
On 27 August 2019, Ćorić joined Spanish club Almería in the Segunda División on loan for the 2019–20 season.

VVV-Venlo (loan) 
On 3 October 2020, Ćorić moved to Dutch club VVV-Venlo, on a loan deal until the end of the season. The deal included an option to buy.

Olimpija Ljubljana (loan) 
On 16 February 2021, due to a lack of playing time Ćorić ended his loan with VVV-Venlo and joined Slovenian side Olimpija Ljubljana on a loan deal for the remainder of the 2020–21 Slovenian PrvaLiga season.

International career

Ćorić played with Croatia's youth teams, from 2012 to 2016, and made his senior international debut in a 1–0 win over Moldova on 27 May 2016, entering as a half-time substitute.

In May 2016, he was selected in Croatia's 23-man final squad for UEFA Euro 2016. Ćorić was not selected for the 2018 FIFA World Cup preliminary squad.

Personal life 
Ćorić was born in Zagreb to Herzegovinian Croat parents from Široki Brijeg; his father, Miljenko, is a football manager in the Zagreb area with whom Ante attended training sessions starting at a very young age.

Ćorić is engaged to Sara Prenga, Besnik Prenga's daughter and Herdi Prenga's sister.

Career statistics

Club

International

Honours
Dinamo Zagreb
 Croatian First Football League: 2013–14, 2014–15, 2015–16, 2017–18
 Croatian Football Cup: 2015–16, 2017–18

Olimpija Ljubljana
Slovenian Cup: 2020–21

Individual
 Croatian Football Hope of the Year: 2015

References

External links

 
 
 
 Ante Ćorić profile at GNK Dinamo Zagreb

Living people
1997 births
Footballers from Zagreb
Croatian footballers
Association football midfielders
Croatia youth international footballers
Croatia under-21 international footballers
Croatia international footballers
Croatian expatriate footballers
GNK Dinamo Zagreb players
A.S. Roma players
UD Almería players
VVV-Venlo players
NK Olimpija Ljubljana (2005) players
FC Zürich players
Croatian Football League players
Serie A players
Segunda División players
Eredivisie players
Slovenian PrvaLiga players
Swiss Super League players
Expatriate footballers in Austria
Croatian expatriate sportspeople in Austria
Expatriate footballers in Italy
Croatian expatriate sportspeople in Italy
Expatriate footballers in Spain
Croatian expatriate sportspeople in Spain
Expatriate footballers in the Netherlands
Croatian expatriate sportspeople in the Netherlands
Expatriate footballers in Slovenia
Croatian expatriate sportspeople in Slovenia
Expatriate footballers in Switzerland
Croatian expatriate sportspeople in Switzerland
UEFA Euro 2016 players